HD 56618 is a single star in the southern constellation of Canis Major. It is a red-hued star that is faintly visible to the naked eye with an apparent visual magnitude of 4.66. This object is located at a distance of approximately 390 light years from the Sun based on parallax measurements. It is drifting further away with a radial velocity of +41.5 km/s, having come to within  some 2.2 million years ago. Olin J. Eggen listed it as a probable member of the Hyades supercluster.

This is an aging red giant star currently on the asymptotic giant branch with a stellar classification of M2III. It is not longer undergoing core hydrogen fusion and has expanded to 61 times the radius of the Sun. The star is radiating 700 times the luminosity of the Sun from its enlarged photosphere at an effective temperature of 3,797 K.

References

M-type giants
Canis Major
Hyades Stream
Durchmusterung objects
Canis Majoris, 147
056618
035205
2766